Madeleine Clare Hinch,  (born 8 October 1988), known as Maddie Hinch is an English field hockey player who plays as a goalkeeper for Tilburg HC and  England and Great Britain national teams.

Club career
In 2021-22 she played club hockey in the Dutch Hoofdklasse for Tilburg Hockey Club.

Hinch has also played club hockey for Dutch club SCHC, Exmouth, Leicester and Holcombe.

International career
She began playing hockey after a schoolteacher spotted her catching and diving talents in a game of rounders. Initially she was not overly keen on playing in goal and suffered a number of rejections as a youngster, but persevered and won a Youth Olympic Games medal.  She made her full international debut in 2008, but narrowly missed out on a place in the Great Britain squad for the 2012 Summer Olympics.  She soon took over as number one choice and won the silver medal for England at the 2014 Commonwealth Games in Glasgow.

In 2015, she enjoyed a breakthrough year, saving a penalty to ensure England won the EuroHockey Championships in London, then being nominated for FIH Goalkeeper of the Year.

In 2016, she played in her first Olympic games, surpassing 100 international appearances during the Rio 2016 Olympics. She won an Olympic gold medal in Rio in 2016, saving all four penalties in the final shoot-out against The Netherlands. Her outstanding performance was widely credited in the media as the deciding factor in the game's outcome. 

She won a bronze medal at the 2018 Commonwealth Games. In September 2018, she decided to step aside from the national team, expressing her will to get back in the near future.

On 16 May 2019 it was announced that she had re-joined the England & GB Central Programme

In 2022 she won a gold medal at the Commonwealth Games.

Education
Hinch was privately educated at the independent Hazlegrove,Sparford Yeovil  from 2002 to 2007. She has a degree in Sport & Exercise Science from Loughborough University.

References

External links
 

Living people
Field hockey players at the 2014 Commonwealth Games
1988 births
Commonwealth Games silver medallists for England
English female field hockey players
Female field hockey goalkeepers
Medalists at the 2016 Summer Olympics
Olympic gold medallists for Great Britain
Olympic medalists in field hockey
Field hockey players at the 2016 Summer Olympics
Field hockey players at the 2020 Summer Olympics
Olympic field hockey players of Great Britain
British female field hockey players
Commonwealth Games medallists in field hockey
Members of the Order of the British Empire
Expatriate field hockey players
English expatriate sportspeople in the Netherlands
SCHC players
Holcombe Hockey Club players
Loughborough Students field hockey players
Olympic bronze medallists for Great Britain
Medalists at the 2020 Summer Olympics
Commonwealth Games bronze medallists for England
Commonwealth Games gold medallists for England
Field hockey players at the 2018 Commonwealth Games
Field hockey players at the 2022 Commonwealth Games
Medallists at the 2014 Commonwealth Games
Medallists at the 2018 Commonwealth Games
Medallists at the 2022 Commonwealth Games